IRQL may refer to:

Computing
Interrupt request level, the priority of an interrupt request
IRQL (Windows), a concept in the Windows NT kernel